The Boston Music Hall was a concert hall located on Winter Street in Boston, Massachusetts, with an additional entrance on Hamilton Place.

One of the oldest continuously operating theaters in the United States, it was built in 1852 and was the original home of the Boston Symphony Orchestra. The hall closed in 1900 and was converted into a vaudeville theater named the Orpheum Theatre. The Orpheum, which still stands today, was substantially rebuilt in 1915 by architect Thomas W. Lamb as a movie theater. 

The hall has no connection with Boston's "Music Hall", a theater which is now known as the Wang Theatre.

History
The Boston Music Hall was built in 1852, thanks to a donation of $100,000, made by the Harvard Musical Association, for its construction. George Snell, assisted by Alpheus C. Morse, was the architect. The Handel and Haydn Society performed at the hall's inaugural concert. The hall was the first home of the Boston Symphony Orchestra, founded in 1881 and was also the birthplace of the New England Conservatory of Music. The BSO performed the American premiere of the Piano Concerto No. 1, by Pyotr Ilyich Tchaikovsky here. After being threatened by road building and subway construction, the Music Hall was replaced as the home of the Boston Symphony in 1900, by Symphony Hall. 

In addition to concerts, the hall presented important speakers of the time. Theodore Parker preached here, and his congregation, the Twenty-Eighth Congregational Society, worshiped here from 1852 to 1863. Methodist minister Henry Morgan lectured in the hall ca.1859. On December 31, 1862, the eve of the day the Emancipation Proclamation took effect, Northern abolitionists gathered at the Music Hall to celebrate as the clock struck midnight. Frederick Douglass, Wendell Phillips, Harriet Beecher Stowe, William Lloyd Garrison, and Harriet Tubman attended. Oscar Wilde lectured here in 1882.

Organ

The Boston Music Hall Organ, installed in 1862, was the first concert pipe organ installed in the United States. It was commissioned in 1857 and built in Germany by E.F. Walcker and Company of Ludwigsburg. It was the largest in the US at the time, containing 5,474 pipes and 84 registers. 

The organ was removed from the Music Hall in 1884 to provide more performing space for the Boston Symphony. Initially put into storage, the organ was rebuilt and installed by the Methuen Organ Company in the Serlo Organ Hall in Methuen, Massachusetts, which was built to house the organ. The organ was later rebuilt again and augmented by the Aeolian-Skinner Organ Company. Today Serlo Organ Hall is known as the Methuen Memorial Music Hall and concerts are regularly presented on the organ, still considered one of the leading instruments in the US.

Orpheum Theatre

When the Boston Symphony moved to Symphony Hall in 1900, the Boston Music Hall closed. It was converted for use as a vaudeville theater in 1900 and operated under a number of different names, including the Music Hall and the Empire Theatre. In 1906, it was renamed the Orpheum Theatre. In 1915, the theater was acquired by the Loew's Theatres chain and reopened again in 1916, rebuilt with a completely new interior, designed by architect Thomas W. Lamb.

See also
 Orpheum Theatre (Boston, Massachusetts), successor to the Music Hall
 Methuen Memorial Music Hall, Methuen, Massachusetts – currently houses the Boston Music Hall's organ

References

External links 

Photos of the Boston Music Hall and Orpheum Theatre at The Boston Historical Society:

Image gallery

Commercial buildings completed in 1852
1852 establishments in Massachusetts
1900 disestablishments in Massachusetts
Concert halls in Massachusetts
Music venues in Boston
Theatres in Boston
19th century in Boston